Chrysomyxa cassandrae is a fungus that occurs throughout the North Temperate Zone wherever Chamaedaphne calyculata occurs, independent of host alternation. Aecial hosts include white spruce (Crane 2001).

References

Fungal plant pathogens and diseases
cassandrae